Kana Kanmani (ml; കാണാ കണ്മണി) is a 2016 Indian television series appearing on Asianet channel from 11 April 2016 to 26 August 2016. The series ended following its 99th episode. It is the story of Jayanthan Menon and his daughter Manasa.

Gowri Krishna and Dilsha Prasanann won the Best Debut award at the Asianet Television Awards 2016 marking their debut in Malayalam television along with South Indian television actor Sanjay Asrani.

Plot
The family drama starts with Jayanthan Menon's assistant Kaimal meets Chitra (Jayanthan's wife) conveying his wish to meet his daughter Manasa before he dies. However Chitra and Manasa convey their hatred towards him. She sends her friend Krishnendhu to Jayanthan Menon as Manasa. But a turn of events puts all three under the same roof.

Recognition 
Asianet TV awards 2016

 Best debut - Gouri and Dilsha                           Nominated
Best Script
Best Audiography
Best Director
Best editor

Cast 
 Gowri Krishnan as Krishnendu
 Dilsha Prasannan as Manasa
 Sanjay Kumar (Sanjay Asrani) / Risabawa  as Jayanthan Menon
 Balaji Sharma as Jayaprakash Menon
 Anila Sreekumar as Thoolika Teacher
 Vijayakumari as Maheshwari
 Shivadas as Kaimal
 Arun G Raghavan as Giri
 Sharat Swamy as Sidharth
 Anand narayanan as Ragesh
 Venu as Mukundan Menon
 Mithun as Manu
 Geetha as Chitra
 Arya Rohit as Sarayu
 Uma devi Nair as Devayani
 Manka Mahesh as Muttashi

References 

2016 Indian television series debuts
2016 Indian television series endings
Malayalam-language television shows
Asianet (TV channel) original programming